Carlos María Pajarón del Álamo (7 April 1903 – 9 August 1961) was a Spanish sprinter. He competed in the men's 200 metres at the 1920 Summer Olympics.

References

1903 births
1961 deaths
Athletes (track and field) at the 1920 Summer Olympics
Spanish male sprinters
Olympic athletes of Spain
Place of birth missing